Luke Aaron Benward (born May 12, 1995) is an American actor and singer. He is best known for his role as Will in the Disney film Cloud 9 (2014).  His first starring role was Billy Forrester in How to Eat Fried Worms (2006), and as Charlie Tuttle in Minutemen (2008). He played the role of Dillon in Ravenswood and Bo in the Netflix film Dumplin'.  He recurred as Teddy's boyfriend, Beau, on the final season of the Disney Channel series Good Luck Charlie.

Early life
Benward was born in Franklin, Tennessee, the son of Kenda (née Wilkerson) and Aaron Benward. His father is in the country duo Blue County, his mother is a part-time actress, model, and acting coach, and his grandfather is Contemporary Christian music artist Jeoffrey Benward. He has two younger sisters.

Career
Benward's acting career started when he landed a role in the film We Were Soldiers as David Moore in 2002. His success grew in 2006, when he played Billy Forrester in the movie How to Eat Fried Worms, which he won a Young Artist Award for in the category of Best Young Ensemble in a Feature Film.

He also played 14-year-old Charlie Tuttle in the Disney Channel movie Minutemen, the 14-year-old Alan in Dear John, and the little boy who helps the abused girl in the music video "Concrete Angel" by Martina McBride. Benward's first album, Let Your Love Out, came out on January 5, 2009, and contained five songs.

He also toured with the Christian group iShine LIVE for a short time, where he would sing his music in concert. The record label that signed him is called In Crowd Productions, whose collective credits include Hilary Duff, India.Arie, the Backstreet Boys, Mat Kearney, Death Cab for Cutie, and the Jonas Brothers.

He has also been in various commercials, including Nintendo, McDonald's, Willy Wonka, American Express, and Hamburger Helper. He also played the role of Nicky in Mostly Ghostly and played Stevie Dewberry in the film Because of Winn-Dixie. He also played in the Disney Channel Original Movie Girl vs. Monster as Ryan Dean, the love interest of Skylar Lewis (Olivia Holt).

Benward also had a recurring role as Matthew Pearson, the ex-boyfriend of Emily Hobbs (Ryan Newman) on See Dad Run. He was in the movie Cloud 9 from Disney Channel with Liv and Maddie star Dove Cameron and appeared as Beau, Teddy's love interest, on six episodes of Good Luck Charlie, reuniting him with his Minutemen costar Jason Dolley. He appeared as Thor in the third-season premiere of the Disney Channel series Girl Meets World.

Filmography

Film

Television

Discography

Extended play

Promotional singles

Other appearances

Music videos

References

External links

 
 
  iShine Tour interview

1995 births
21st-century American male actors
American male child actors
American male film actors
American male television actors
American male pop singers
Living people
Male actors from Tennessee
Singers from Tennessee
21st-century American male singers
21st-century American singers